Guilherme Seefeldt Krolow (born 15 June 1992), commonly known as Foguinho, is a Brazilian footballer who plays as a midfielder for Vegalta Sendai.

Career statistics

Club

Notes

References

External links 

 

1992 births
Living people
Brazilian footballers
Brazilian expatriate footballers
Association football midfielders
Campeonato Brasileiro Série B players
Campeonato Brasileiro Série D players
Campeonato Brasileiro Série C players
J1 League players
J2 League players
Esporte Clube Pelotas players
Grêmio Foot-Ball Porto Alegrense players
Ferroviário Atlético Clube (CE) players
Ceará Sporting Club players
Mirassol Futebol Clube players
Associação Desportiva Recreativa e Cultural Icasa players
Oeste Futebol Clube players
Associação Atlética Aparecidense players
G.D. Chaves players
Esporte Clube Cruzeiro players
Sociedade Esportiva e Recreativa Caxias do Sul players
Criciúma Esporte Clube players
Avaí FC players
Vegalta Sendai players
Brazilian expatriate sportspeople in Portugal
Expatriate footballers in Portugal
Brazilian expatriate sportspeople in Japan
Expatriate footballers in Japan